The 2016–17 Mid-American Conference women's basketball season began with practices in October 2016, followed by the start of the 2016–17 NCAA Division I women's basketball season in November. Conference play began in January 2017 and concluded in March 2017. Central Michigan won the regular season title with a record of 15–3 by one game over Ball State. Larissa Lurken of Kent State was named MAC Player of the Year.

Sixth-seeded Toledo won the MAC tournament by beating fourth-seeded Northern Illinois in the final. Toledo was placed as the #10 seed in the Stockton Region of the NCAA tournament. They lost to Creighton. Central Michigan, Ball State, Kent State, Ohio, and Northern Illinois all qualified for the WNIT.

Preseason awards
The preseason coaches' poll and league awards were announced by the league office on October 27, 2016.

Preseason women's basketball coaches poll
(First place votes in parenthesis)

East Division
 Ohio (9) 69
 Buffalo (3) 60
 Akron 48
 Bowling Green 30
 Miami 27
 Kent State 18

West Division
 Central Michigan (12) 72
 Ball State 53
 Toledo 53
 Western Michigan 34
 Northern Illinois 25
 Eastern Michigan 15

Regular Season Champion
Central Michigan (6), Ohio (5), Buffalo (1)

Tournament champs
Central Michigan (7), Ohio (4), Buffalo (1)

Honors

Postseason

Mid–American tournament

NCAA tournament

Women's National Invitational Tournament

Postseason awards

Coach of the Year: Todd Starkey, Kent State
Player of the Year: Larissa Lurken, Kent State 
Freshman of the Year: Lauren Dickerson, Miami
Defensive Player of the Year: Tinara Moore, Central Michigan
Sixth Man of the Year: Destiny Washington, Ball State

Honors

See also
2016–17 Mid-American Conference men's basketball season

References